Azul (English title: Blue) is a Mexican telenovela produced by Pinkye Morris and Yuri Breña for Televisa. It premiered on Canal de las Estrellas on January 8, 1996 and ended on March 22, 1996.

Kate del Castillo and Armando Araiza starred as protagonists, while Elvira Monsell starred as main antagonist.

Plot 
Alejandra is a young woman who works at the Dolphinarium is an amusement park in Mexico City, works with Juanjo and Fina to care for dolphins and Keiko, a tender orca, who lives in the park and entertains visitors.

Cast 
 
Kate del Castillo as Alejandra
Armando Araiza as Enrique Valverde
Keiko as Keiko
Alma Muriel as Elena Curi
Patricia Reyes Spíndola as Martha
Armando Silvestre as Ernesto Valverde
Alfonso Iturralde as Dr. Carlos Grimberg
Elvira Monsell as Paz
Lucila Mariscal as Fina
Juan Carlos Serrán as Dr. Solórzano
Tiaré Scanda as Karina
Arturo Beristáin as Gustavo Galván
Gabriela Hassel as Yeni
Roberto Ramírez Garza as Ramón
Aída Naredo as Lola
Gustavo Ganem as Pancho
Oscar Uriel as Juanjo
Eduardo Schillinsky as Sergio
Julio Bracho as Luis Aguirre
Zoraida Gómez as La Chamos
Eleazar Gómez as Lupito
Hixem Gómez as Héctor
Ulises Ávila as Ulises
Daniel Habif as Ricky
Paulo Serrán as Beto
Pedro Marás as Det. Mendoza
Manuel Sánchez Martínez as El Tranzas
Mané Macedo as Julia
Renata Fernández as Renata
Jaime Gerner as El Sueco
José Antonio Coro as Dr. Meyer
Claudia Eliza Aguilar as Obrera
Socorro Avelar as Directora
Raúl Araiza as Javier Valverde
Moisés Iván as El Muelas
Mauricio Aspe as Roberto
Maristel Molina as María
Silvia Contreras as Delia
Galilea Montijo as Mara
Rudy Casanova as Dr. Lefebre
Ana de la Reguera as Cecilia
Elías Rubio as Rubén
Anabell Gardoqui as Cecilia
Laura Montalvo as Clara
Carlos Martínez Chávez as Dr. Serrán
Luis Bernardos as Vicente
Fernando Arturo Jaramillo as Locutor

References

External links

1996 telenovelas
Mexican telenovelas
1996 Mexican television series debuts
1996 Mexican television series endings
Spanish-language telenovelas
Television shows set in Mexico
Televisa telenovelas